BCBG may refer to:

French phrase

Other 

 Bon Chic Bon Genre, an album by Campag Velocet
A women's clothing line created by Max Azria